Unequal treaty is the name given by the Chinese to a series of treaties signed during the 19th and early 20th centuries, between China (mostly referring to the Qing dynasty) and various Western powers (specifically the British Empire, France, the German Empire, the United States, and the Russian Empire), and the Empire of Japan. The agreements, often reached after a military defeat or a threat of military invasion, contained one-sided terms, requiring China to cede land, pay reparations, open treaty ports, give up tariff autonomy, legalise opium import, and grant extraterritorial privileges to foreign citizens.

With the rise of Chinese nationalism and anti-imperialism in the 1920s, both the Kuomintang and the Chinese Communist Party used the concept to characterize the Chinese experience of losing sovereignty between roughly 1840 to 1950. The term "unequal treaty" became associated with the concept of China's "century of humiliation", especially the concessions to foreign powers and the loss of tariff autonomy through treaty ports.

Japanese and Koreans also use the term to refer to several treaties that resulted in the loss of their sovereignty, to varying degrees.

China

In China, the term "unequal treaty" first came into use in the early 1920s. Dong Wang, a professor of contemporary and modern Chinese history at the Gordon College in Massachusetts, United States, noted that "while the phrase has long been widely used, it nevertheless lacks a clear and unambiguous meaning" and that there is "no agreement about the actual number of treaties signed between China and foreign countries that should be counted as 'unequal'." 

Historian Immanuel Hsu states that the Chinese viewed the treaties they signed with Western powers and Russia as unequal "because they were not negotiated by nations treating each other as equals but were imposed on China after a war, and because they encroached upon China's sovereign rights ... which reduced her to semicolonial status". 

In response, historian Elizabeth Cobbs writes in American Umpire, her argument that "democratic capitalism" has never engaged in imperialism: "Ironically, however, the treaties also resulted partly from China's initial reluctance to consider any treaties whatsoever, since it viewed all other nations as inferior. It did not wish to be equal."

In many cases, China was effectively forced to pay large amounts of financial reparations, open up ports for trade, cede or lease territories (such as Outer Manchuria and Outer Northwest China (including Zhetysu) to the Russian Empire, Hong Kong and Weihaiwei to the United Kingdom, Guangzhouwan to France, Kwantung Leased Territory and Taiwan to the Empire of Japan, the Jiaozhou Bay concession to the German Empire and concession territory in Tientsin, Shamian, Hankou, Shanghai etc.), and make various other concessions of sovereignty to foreign spheres of influence, following military threats.

The earliest treaty later referred to as "unequal" was the 1841 Convention of Chuenpi negotiations during the First Opium War. The first treaty between China and the United Kingdom termed "unequal" was the Treaty of Nanjing in 1842.

Following Qing China's defeat, treaties with Britain opened up five ports to foreign trade, while also allowing foreign missionaries, at least in theory, to reside within China. Foreign residents in the port cities were afforded trials by their own consular authorities rather than the Chinese legal system, a concept termed extraterritoriality. Under the treaties, the UK and the US established the British Supreme Court for China and Japan and United States Court for China in Shanghai.

Chinese resentment
After World War I, patriotic consciousness in China focused on the treaties, which now became widely known as "unequal treaties". The Nationalist Party and the Communist Party competed to convince the public that their approach would be more effective. Germany was forced to terminate its rights, the Soviet Union surrendered them, and the United States organized the  Washington Conference to negotiate them.

After Chiang Kai-shek declared a new national government in 1927, the Western powers quickly offered diplomatic recognition, arousing anxiety in Japan. The new government declared to the Great Powers that China had been exploited for decades under unequal treaties, and that the time for such treaties was over, demanding they renegotiate all of them on equal terms.

Towards the end of the unequal treaties
After the Boxer Rebellion and the signing of the Anglo-Japanese Alliance of 1902, Germany started to reassess the policy approach towards China. In 1907 Germany suggested a German-Chinese-American agreement that never materialised. Thus China entered the new era of ending unequal treaties on March 14, 1917 when it broke off diplomatic relations with Germany. China declared war on Germany on August 17 1917.

These acts voided the unequal treaty of 1861, resulting in the reinstatement of Chinese control on the concessions of Tianjin and Hankou to China. In 1919, China refused to sign the Peace Treaty of Versailles. On May 20, 1921, China secured with the German-Chinese peace treaty (Deutsch-chinesischer Vertrag zur Wiederherstellung des Friedenszustandes), considered the first equal treaty between China and a European nation.

Many of the other treaties China considers unequal were repealed during the Second Sino-Japanese War, which started in 1937 and merged into the larger context of World War II. The United States Congress ended American extraterritoriality in December 1943. Significant examples outlasted World War II: treaties regarding Hong Kong remained in place until Hong Kong's 1997 handover, though in 1969, to improve Sino-Soviet relations in the wake of military skirmishes along their border, the People's Republic of China was forced to reconfirm the 1858 Treaty of Aigun and 1860 Treaty of Peking.

Japan and Korea 

When the American Commodore Matthew C. Perry reached Japan in 1854, the country signed the Convention of Kanagawa. Its importance was limited.  Much more important was the Harris Treaty of 1858 negotiated by U.S. envoy Townsend Harris.

Korea's first unequal treaty was not with the West but instead with Japan. The Ganghwa Island incident, 1875, saw Japan send Captain Inoue Yoshika and the warship Un'yō with the implied threat of military action to coerce the Korean Kingdom of Joseon.  This forced Korea to open its doors to Japan by signing the Japan–Korea Treaty of 1876.

The unequal treaties ended at various times for the countries involved. Japan's victories in the 1894–95 First Sino-Japanese War convinced many in the West that unequal treaties could no longer be enforced on Japan.  Korea's unequal treaties with European states became largely null and void in 1910, when it was annexed by Japan.

Mongolia

Selected list of treaties

Imposed on China

Imposed on Japan

Imposed on Korea

Modern uses 
In 2018, Malaysian Prime Minister Mahathir Mohamad compared Chinese Belt and Road Initiative infrastructure projects in Malaysia to unequal treaties. He said "They know that when they lend big sums of money to a poor country, in the end they may have to take the project for themselves," and "China knows very well that it had to deal with unequal treaties in the past imposed upon China by Western powers. So China should be sympathetic toward us. They know we cannot afford this".

See also
 Western imperialism in Asia
 Concessions in China
 List of Chinese treaty ports
 Sick man of Asia
 Century of humiliation
 Client state
 Puppet state
 Most favoured nation
 Normanton incident

References

Bibliography 

 Auslin, Michael R. (2004).   Negotiating with Imperialism: The Unequal Treaties and the Culture of Japanese Diplomacy. Cambridge: Harvard University Press. ; OCLC 56493769
  OCLC 300287988
 Nish, I. H (1975). "Japan Reverses the Unequal Treaties: The Anglo-Japanese Commercial Treaty of 1894". Journal of Oriental Studies. 13 (2): 137–146.
 Perez, Louis G (1999). Japan Comes of Age: Mutsu Munemitsu & the Revision of the Unequal Treaties. p. 244.
 Ringmar, Erik (2013). Liberal Barbarism: The European Destruction of the Palace of the Emperor of China. New York: Palgrave Macmillan.
 Wang, Dong (2003). "The Discourse of Unequal Treaties in Modern China". Pacific Affairs. 76 (3): 399–425. 
 Wang, Dong.  (2005). China's Unequal Treaties: Narrating National History. Lanham, Maryland: Lexington Books. .
 Fravel, M. Taylor (2008). Strong Borders, Secure Nation: Cooperation and Conflict in China's Territorial Disputes. Princeton University Press. 
 Halleck, Henry Wager. (1861). International law: or, Rules regulating the intercourse of states in peace and war. New York: D. Van Nostrand. OCLC 852699
 Korean Mission to the Conference on the Limitation of Armament, Washington, D.C., 1921–1922. (1922). Korea's Appeal to the Conference on Limitation of Armament. Washington: U.S. Government Printing Office. OCLC 12923609
 Fravel, M. Taylor (2005). Regime Insecurity and International Cooperation: Explaining China's Compromises in Territorial Disputes. International Security. 30 (2): 46–83. doi:10.1162/016228805775124534. ISSN 0162-2889.

19th century in China
19th century in Japan
19th century in Korea
Boxer Rebellion
History of European colonialism
Foreign relations of the Qing dynasty
Free trade imperialism
History of the foreign relations of Japan
Lists of treaties
Treaties of the Joseon dynasty
 
Foreign relations of the Empire of Japan
China–Russian Empire relations